A Ciguapa (pronounced see-GWAH-pah) is a mythological creature of Dominican folklore. They are commonly described as having human female form with brown or dark blue skin, backward facing feet, and very long manes of smooth, glossy hair that covers their bodies. They supposedly inhabit the high mountains of the Dominican Republic.

Overview 
These creatures have nocturnal habits. Also, due to the position of their feet, one can never quite tell which direction the beings are moving by looking at their footprints. Some people believe that they bring death, and it is said that one should not look them in the eye, otherwise the person is at risk of being bewitched permanently. The only vocalization made by ciguapas is said to be a kind of whine or chirping.

Ciguapas are considered to be magical beings, beautiful in appearance to some, yet horrendous to others. All sources agree that they are wild creatures. They are compared in many cases to mermaids: beautiful yet cruel, and far from innocent. Deceitful and ready to capture the wayward traveler, it is said that they are so beautiful that they can lure men into the forest to make love with them, only to kill them afterward. Legends have suggested that some are benevolent and wish not to kill trespassers, though not much evidence supports this claim. Even today, one can still find inhabitants who confirm having sighted a ciguapa. Some also state that she is hard to find and locate due to her backwards feet, so she is almost impossible to track unless you know to follow the feet backwards.

Lore states that the only way to capture a ciguapa is by tracking them at night, during a full moon, with a black and white polydactylic dog (called a cinqueño dog).

Though many believe that the myth of the ciguapa is of Taino origin, it has been argued that it is probably of more recent concoction because the Ciguapa myth has many characteristics in common with the ancient European mermaids. No known Taino artifacts or lore make reference to any creature even remotely similar to it. Also, the legend may have originated from other myths, as distant as the Guaraní Curupí or the Hindu Churel, which was described by Rudyard Kipling in My Own True Ghost Story as having traits similar to those of the ciguapa. The Hindu hypothesis may be far-fetched since there is no way to ascertain how this story got to the Dominican Republic during the nineteenth century when no cultural exchange occurred between these nations.

A Dominican film called El Mito de la Ciguapa (The Myth of the Ciguapa) was released in 2009.

A children's picture book was created by Julia Alvarez called The Secret of the Footprints in 2002, that features ciguapas.

See also
Sihuanaba

References

External links 
 The Phoenixian Book of Creatures
 DICCIONARIO DE MITOS Y LEYENDAS
 La Ciguapa by J.E. Marcano

Mythological characters
Caribbean legendary creatures
Dominican Republic culture
Female legendary creatures